Phillip Raymond Ford (born May 31, 1961 in San Rafael, California) is a stage and film producer, director and entertainer who served most of the 1980s as "honorary straight man" in the legendary San Francisco drag troupe Sluts A-Go-Go.  He is best known as the producer and director of Vegas in Space, the celebrated cult film starring the Sluts A-Go-Go, which created a sensation at the 1992 Sundance Film Festival, appeared at festivals worldwide, was broadcast on USA Network's Up All Night with Rhonda Shear and was featured on Entertainment Tonight and the E! Entertainment Television Network.

Career 
With Doris Fish, Miss X and "Tippi", Ford created and appeared onstage with the Sluts A-Go-Go in a string of notorious theatrical nightclub spectacles including The Miss Solar System Pageant (1984), The Happy Hour Show (1985), Nightclub of the Living Dead (1986), Box Office Poison (1987), Sluts A-Go-Go Still Alive! (1989) and Who Does That Bitch Think She Is?: An All Star Tribute To Doris Fish (1990).  He directed such stage plays as Phillip R. Ford's Dolls, 1993's sensational send-up of the 1967 film, Valley of the Dolls, starring Connie Champagne at the On-Broadway Theater in San Francisco (for which he directed eight short films), a remarkably dramatic The Bad Seed (1987) at Theater Rhinoceros and the vivid one-woman tribute, Simply Stunning – The Doris Fish Story (2002) featuring Arturo Galster, based on the life and work of his mentor and collaborator Doris Fish.  As an actor Ford has appeared in San Francisco in the title role in Behind the Candelabra – My Life with Liberace (2002) a play adapted by Jennifer Blowdryer from the memoir of Liberace chauffeur/paramour Scott Thorsen.  He also appeared onstage at the Plush Room in TenderLoins (1994), sang using his own voice as Mrs. Miller in The Sick and Twisted Players’ The Cool Ones (1994) and acted in the universally reviled motion picture Virtue (1999).

Ford began making films at the age of fifteen and his first professional film short, Rollercoaster to Hell (1982), was featured on KTVU's Creature Features.  He has served as a Guest Lecturer in "Contemporary Cinema" at his alma mater, San Francisco State University, from which he holds a Bachelor of Arts Degree in Film Production

His writing has been featured in the anthology Good Advice for Young Trendy People of All Ages (Manic D Press, 2005) and in Straight to Hell #65 - The Manhattan Review of Unnatural Acts.

See also 
Troma Entertainment
Doris Fish

Sources 
 "The Strange Case of Vegas in Space: Celebrating the 20th Anniversary of a Midnight Movie Masterpiece" article
 New York Times review
 San Francisco Chronicle - 'Generosity amid the glitter'

Further reading

External links
 The Making of Vegas in Space
 Phillip R. Ford on imdb
 Vegas in Space on imdb
 Troma Entertainment
 Vegas in Space mash-up video (Italy)
 Devildead fan site (France)
 Bright Lights Film Journal Vegas in Space 

1961 births
Living people
LGBT film directors
LGBT theatre directors
People from San Rafael, California
Film directors from California